Ilkka Remes (born 29 July 1963) is a retired Finnish football defender.

References

1963 births
Living people
Sportspeople from Lahti
Finnish footballers
FC Kuusysi players
Association football defenders
Finland international footballers